The close-mid central unrounded vowel, or high-mid central unrounded vowel, is a type of vowel sound used in some spoken languages. This is a mirrored letter e and should not be confused with the schwa , which is a turned e. It was added to the IPA in 1993; before that, this vowel was transcribed  (Latin small letter e with umlaut, not Cyrillic small letter yo). Certain older sources transcribe this vowel .

The  letter may be used with a lowering diacritic , to denote the mid central unrounded vowel.

Conversely, the symbol for the mid central vowel may be used with a raising diacritic  to denote the close-mid central unrounded vowel, although that is more accurately written with an additional unrounding diacritic  to explicitly denote the lack of rounding (the canonical value of IPA  is undefined for rounding).

Features

Occurrence

Notes

References

External links
 

Close-mid vowels
Central vowels
Unrounded vowels